Isaac Lucas (born 11 February 1999 in Australia) is an Australian rugby union player who is currently contracted to Ricoh Black Rams in Japanese rugby union. Lucas' primary position is fullback but he has made numerous appearances at flyhalf throughout his career. He was named in the Reds squad for week 2 in 2019.

Reference list

External links
Rugby.com.au profile
itsrugby.co.uk profile

1999 births
Australian rugby union players
Living people
Rugby union centres
Rugby union fly-halves
Rugby union fullbacks
Queensland Reds players
Brisbane City (rugby union) players
Black Rams Tokyo players